Liu Xuan is the name of:

Gengshi Emperor (died 25 AD), personal name Liu Xuan, emperor of the Han dynasty
Liu Xuan (Three Kingdoms) (224–264), crown prince of Shu during the Three Kingdoms period
Liu Xuan (Han Zhao) (died 308 AD), politician of Han Zhao during the Sixteen Kingdoms period
Liu Xuan (gymnast) (born 1979), Chinese gymnast, singer and actress
Xuan Liu (poker player) (born 1985), Canadian poker player